Edward Wilson (13 November 1813 – 10 January 1878) was an English-Australian journalist and philanthropist.

Family
The second of the three children of John Wilson (1774-1834), a linen draper, and Mary Wilson (1766-1838), née Jones, Edward Wilson was born at Hampstead, London on 13 November 1813. He never married.

Education
He was educated at a "large private school" in Hamstead  where, among his schoolmates, were William Clark Haines (1810-1866), the first Premier of Victoria, the brothers James Spowers (1813-1879) and Allan Spowers (1815-1876), proprietors of The Argus, and Douglas Thomas Kilburn (1813-1871), the artist, ethnographer, and daguerreotypist.

Having left school, with his parents wanting him to "engage in commerce", he entered a business house at Manchester, and subsequently went to London, involved in the "Manchester trade".

Australia
In 1842 he migrated to Australia. At first, he had a small property on the northern outskirts of Melbourne but in 1844, in partnership with James S. Johnston, took up a cattle station near Dandenong, Victoria.

The Argus
He bought The Argus around 1847 from William Kerr, incorporated with it The Patriot, and five years later absorbed another journal, The Daily News.

In the early days of the gold-rush the paper was produced under great difficulties, but the circulation kept increasing, and it became a valuable property. Wilson strenuously opposed the influx of convicts from Tasmania, fought for the separation of the Port Phillip District from New South Wales, and opposed Governor Charles Hotham in his attitude to the miners; but when the rebellion broke out he took the stand that there were peaceable and legitimate methods of obtaining redress. When Charles Gavan Duffy came to Victoria and went into politics Wilson sent him a list of suggested reforms which included justice to the Aborigines, the organizing of agriculture as a department of the state, the introduction of the ballot into municipal elections, and the leasing of crown lands for cultivation with the right of ultimate purchase. He was the first to raise the cry "unlock the lands". He was in fact a thorough democrat in sentiment, and an ardent reformer. Costs of running the Argus had increased and Wilson was close to ruin, but was saved when Lauchlan Mackinnon bought a partnership from James Gill, and took over management.

Rambles at the Antipodes
In 1857 and 1858, he travelled throughout colonial Australia and New Zealand, and on to England  where he consulted experts in relation to his failing eyesight (due to cataracts)  via the so-called "Overland Route"; and, whilst doing so wrote an extended series of 21 articles for The Argus''' newspaper. The articles, which were published on a regular basis (often three articles in a single week), were later collected together and published in their aggregate (with an additional statistical appendix, and 12 lithographs by Samuel Thomas Gill) in 1859, as Rambles at the Antipodes (1859).

Acclimatisation
He took much interest in acclimatization, founding the Acclimatization Society in Melbourne in 1861, as its first president, and, in the same year, visiting Sydney and founding the Acclimatization Society of New South Wales.

England
Wilson finally settled in 1864 at Hayes, Bromley in England, and lived the life of an English country gentleman, at Hayes Place, farming 300 acres. He occasionally contributed to The Times and the Fortnightly Review; an article from this journal, Principles of Representation, was published as a pamphlet in 1866. Another pamphlet, on Acclimatization, was printed in 1875.

Death
He died at Hayes, in Kent, on 10 January 1878. His remains were repatriated to Australia on the SS Aconcagua, and he was buried in the Melbourne General Cemetery, on 7 July 1878, in a grave that "is immediately opposite the burial place of Sir Charles Hotham".See photograph of Wilson's grave at: Edward Wilson, at Find a Grave.

Estate
The bulk of his estate was used to form the Edward Wilson Trust which since his death has distributed several million dollars to Victorian charities, in particular the Melbourne, Alfred and Children's hospitals in Victoria.

Works

 Wilson, Edward (1856a), "The Aborigines", The Argus'', (Sunday, 16 March 1856), pp.4-5.
 Wilson, Edward (1856b),  "The Aborigines", The Sydney Morning Herald, (Saturday, 22 March 1856), p.5: a better quality reprint of 1856a.
 Wilson, Edward (1857a), "Moreton Bay. No.I", The Argus, (Saturday, 22 August 1857), p.4.
 Wilson, Edward (1857b), "Moreton Bay. No.II", The Argus, (Saturday, 24 August 1857), p.5.
 Wilson, Edward (1857c), "Moreton Bay (No.III)", The Argus, (Thursday, 27 August 1857), p.5.
 Wilson, Edward (1858), "The Overland Route. No.VI", The Argus, (Monday, 18 October 1858), p.5.
 Wilson, Edward (1857d), "A Trip down the Murray (No.I)", The Argus, (Tuesday, 24 November 1857), p.5.
 Wilson, Edward (1857e), "A Trip down the Murray (No.II)", The Argus, (Thursday, 26 November 1857), p.4.
 Wilson, Edward (1857f), "A Trip down the Murray (No.III)", The Argus, (Wednesday, 2 December 1857), p.5.
 Wilson, Edward (1857g), "A Trip down the Murray (No.IV)", The Argus, (Saturday, 5 December 1857), p.5.
 Wilson, Edward (1857h), "A Trip down the Murray (No.V)", The Argus, (Saturday, 5 December 1857), p.5.
 Wilson, Edward (1857i), "A Trip down the Murray (No.VI)", The Argus, (Tuesday, 8 December 1857), p.5.
 Wilson, Edward (1858a), "A Glance at New Zealand. No.I", The Argus, (Friday, 11 June 1858), p.5.
 Wilson, Edward (1858b), "A Glance at New Zealand. No.II", The Argus, (Saturday, 12 June 1858), p.5.
 Wilson, Edward (1858c), "A Glance at New Zealand. No.III", The Argus, (Monday, 14 June 1858), p.5.
 (Wilson, Edward (1858d), "A Glance at New Zealand. No.IV")
 Wilson, Edward (1858e), "A Glance at New Zealand. No.V", The Argus, (Friday, 18 June 1858), p.5.
 Wilson, Edward (1858f), "The Overland Route. No.I", Supplement to The Argus, (Tuesday, 12 October 1858), p.1.
 Wilson, Edward (1858g), "The Overland Route. No.II", Supplement to The Argus, (Wednesday, 13 October 1858), p.1.
 Wilson, Edward (1858h), "The Overland Route. No.III", Supplement to The Argus, (Thursday, 14 October 1858), p.1.
 Wilson, Edward (1858i), "The Overland Route. No.IV", The Argus, (Friday, 15 October 1858), p.6.
 Wilson, Edward (1858j), "The Overland Route. No.V", Supplement to The Argus, (Saturday, 16 October 1858), p.1.
 Wilson, Edward (1858k), "The Overland Route. No.VI", Supplement to The Argus, (Monday, 18 October 1858), p.5.
 Wilson, E (1859), Rambles at the Antipodes: A Series of Sketches of Moreton Bay, New Zealand, the Murray River and South Australia, and the Overland Route: With two Maps and twelve Tinted Lithographs, illustrative of Australian Life, by S.T. Gill, London : W.H. Smith and Son.

Notes

References
 Anon (1878), "Death of Mr. Edward Wilson", The Argus, (Monday, 14 January 1878), p.5.
 
 Turner, H.G. (1911), "Edward Wilson", The Argus, (Saturday, 30 December 1911), p.4.

1813 births
1878 deaths
Australian philanthropists
19th-century Australian journalists
19th-century Australian male writers
19th-century male writers
19th-century philanthropists
Burials at Melbourne General Cemetery
Australian male journalists